There are active proposals to build a new station in South Bend, Indiana for the South Shore Line commuter rail service to replace the existing South Bend Airport station. The existing South Bend Airport station, built in 1992 on the east side of the airport, is a terminus for the train service. The route that carries the South Shore Line to its current station is considered slow and circuitous. While a number of locations have been looked at, the primary contenders have been relocating the station to the west side of South Bend International Airport or building a station in Downtown South Bend. Construction of a station in Downtown South Bend was championed by Pete Buttigieg during his tenure as mayor of South Bend. In late 2022, the Northern Indiana Commuter Transportation District (NICTD) (the operator of the South Shore Line) advanced plans to begin construction a new station at the west side of the airport as early as the fall of 2024, commissioning an engineering study to prepare for this. Even if it builds a new station on the west side of the airport, NICTD has not ruled out the possibility of also building a future spur line to Downtown South Bend.

Existing station
South Bend Airport station, the current South Shore Line terminus serving South Bend, Indiana, was opened at South Bend International Airport on November 20, 1992. The station's location on the east side of the airport was chosen due to the to the existence of a freight spur leading towards location, but this alignment was originally intended to be only temporary. The route that carries the South Shore Line to the station is considered slow and circuitous.

Initial plans to relocate the station to the west side of the airport

Since 2006, plans had been made to explore relocating the station to the west end of the airport in order to potentially cut travel time along the South Shore Line by as much as 10 minutes by having trains approach the airport from the west with a shorter traveling distance and decreased number of at-grade crossings (as few as 7 grade crossings, as opposed to the 23 in the current east approach to the airport). Plans exist by St. Joseph County to construct a rail spur to this area of the airport with the aim of also fostering the creation of an intermodal rail-air freight hub at the airport. An environmental analysis study was conducted in 2008. As of 2013, this had been originally estimated to cost $15 million. These initial plans to relocate the station to the airport's west side faced local opposition from residents of the Ardmore neighborhood of South Bend after it was proposed that the new tracks approaching a station there would travel through the neighborhood (in the area between Oak Road and Lexington Avenue) and displace as many as forty households there.

In 2017, South Bend's redevelopment commission voted to spend $25 million in tax increment financing funds to build a new station. This was part of a deal with St. Joseph County, in which the county would contribute $18 million to double-track the South Shore Line between Gary and Michigan City, while the city would contribute $25 million to pay for the relocation of the station to the airport's west side.

Emergence of alternate proposals
Locally preferred alternatives were presented to the original proposal to relocate the station. One was to instead build a new station on parking lots at Westmoor Street west of Bendix Drive (along existing South Shore Line tracks), located on property owned by the Honeywell Corporation . Concerns about this location, however, included citizens feeling it was not a safe area. There was also discussion of extending the South Shore Line into the city's downtown, though some saw it as likely to be cost-prohibitive. In September 2017, the South Bend Common Council unanimously passed a resolution urging that as many homes in Ardmore as possible be spared from being demolished by the proposed relocation project. A study was made producing an alternate plan which would take a different path. However this proposal too drew opposition from property owners whose land would be impacted.

In December 2017, the South Bend Chocolate Company publicly discussed the possibility of building a station at the location of their planned new factory and tourist destination. They had selected a  site to the southwest of the U.S. 20 intersection of and St. Joseph Valley Parkways planned to build a new factory at, as well as two planned museums: the first a relocation of its existing chocolate museum (which was already receiving 50,000 visitors at its existing location) and the other being a planned "Indiana Dinosaur" Museum. In addition to this, the company was giving open consideration to building other attractions on the site, including a hotel, a winery, a restaurant, a bison farm, and hiking trails. It was argued that a station would enhance the venture's prospects of attracting tourists from Chicago and other areas in the region.

In August 2018, South Bend Mayor Pete Buttigieg began to advocate for a new South Shore Line station to instead be located in South Bend's downtown. Buttigieg expressed hope that a downtown South Shore Line station could be completed by 2025. Before advocating for a downtown station, Buttigieg had previously been supportive of plans to relocate the station to the west side of the airport. Mike Nolan, the president of the Northern Indiana Commuter Transportation District (NICTD, the agency which runs the South Shore Line) expressed his belief that the west side of the airport was more easily attainable in the short-term than a downtown station. There had previously been talk in the 1980s, before the airport station was constructed, of having the South Shore Line stop at the Union Station in downtown South Bend, either instead of or in addition to stopping at the airport. It is likely that, if constructed, a downtown South Bend station would entirely supplant the existing airport station. A downtown station would likely be located near Four Winds Field at Coveleski Stadium and the Union Station Technology Center. It could be adjacent to, if not integrated into, the existing South Bend Transpo South Street Station. When it was built in 1998, South Street Station had been constructed with its passenger facilities near abutting train tracks with an eye towards a future passenger rail component. A study commissioned in 2018 on the feasibility of a downtown station envisioned a downtown station as being located directly between the Union Station Technology and Four Winds Field at Coveleski Stadium, replacing a segment of South Street.

2018 study of five possible locations

In 2018, Mayor Buttigieg ordered a study of five possible locations for a new station serving South Bend. The five locations being explored are the aforementioned west airport relocation, downtown station, and Honeywell Corporation sites, the site in the southwest quadrant of the U.S. 20 and U.S. 31 interchange that the South Bend Chocolate Factory tourist destination was planned for, and the existing South Bend Amtrak station. The study also explored the impact of retaining the existing station instead of constructing a new one. The report was published in April 2018. By August 2018, after the report's publication, both Buttigieg and NICTD president Mike Noland publicly declared their belief that the Honeywell Corporation site, chocolate factory site, and Amtrak site were eliminated from further consideration.

The study found that, indeed, any relocation would decrease the travel time, with the fastest train to Millennium Station if the existing station is retained being 115 minutes, whilst all other station options would have the fastest train to Millennium station be between 82 and 84 minutes. The fastest train from Millennium Station if the existing station is retained will be 118 minutes, whilst for all other options it would be between 90 and 92 minutes.

The costs to build each new station option were estimated by the study. A new west airport station was found to cost $29.5 million, a downtown station was found to cost $102.3 million, the Honeywell Corporation site was found to cost $23.9 million, the chocolate factory site was found to cost $44.3 million, and the Amtrak station was found to cost $31.7 million.

The potential ten-year economic impact of each station option was studied. Retaining the existing station could still generate $39 million in economic impact. The new west airport station could generate $83.8 million, a downtown station could generate $415.3 million, the Honeywell Corporation site could generate either $171.5 million (if mixed-use development is built around it) or $132 million (if industrial development is built around it), the chocolate factory site could generate $144.4 million, and the Amtrak station could generate $139.7 million.

Downtown station feasibility study
In December 2018, an $181,000 engineering study was commissioned by the South Bend Redevelopment Commission to further examine the cost of a downtown station. This study was not made available to the public until, after a public record request, it was released in March 2021 to the South Bend Tribune and thereafter published by the newspaper. The study showed that rerouting South Shore Line trains into the city's downtown would require numerous properties to be acquired, the city's Amtrak station to be relocated, two structures at a public housing complex to be demolished, and a soccer field at the Salvation Army Kroc Center to be demolished.

The study estimated that the cost to construct a downtown station would be $112 million, which is more than the $102 million than the previous study had estimated. The reason for this higher estimate was due to both inflation and challenges that the second study developed a greater understanding of. The study estimated that a downtown station would generate a $430 million economic impact and create 7,770 new jobs in a ten-year period. The study estimated that, when measured through new tax revenue, the return on capital cost would be 40%. However, when measured through economic impact, the return on capital cost was estimated at 336%.

Further developments (2019–2021)
In their 2019 capital plan, NICTD set aside $30 million for a relocation of the station and track realignment.

In early 2019, standing firm in their support for building a rail spur to the west side of the South Bend International Airport, St. Joseph County commissioned a $119,000 study to look at the construction of such a spur. The study would consider two routes running both through the neighborhood located between U.S. 31 and Mayflower Road. The first route to be considered was down Sundown Road, and the second was down Oak Road. Both routes were further west than the earlier-considered route, and were located between Oak Road and Butternut Road. The study was to look at both the potential of a freight-only spur and the potential of a spur shared by both freight and passenger trains. This study has not been released to the public.

As of March 2021, the Federal Aviation Administration had not given permission for the routing of tracks and overhead catenary through a protected area near South Bend International Airport's runway. Such permission would be required for the proposed location on the west side of the airport.

A decision regarding the future of South Bend's South Shore Line station was originally anticipated to be made at some point in 2020. No such decision came. In March 2021, it was reported by the South Bend Tribune that community leaders had not yet reached a consensus as to where to build a new South Shore Line station.

While the 2018 estimate had been that a downtown station would cost $102 million, and the downtown feasibility study estimated that it would cost $112 million, some other cost projections are as high as nearly $200 million. Some St. Joseph County officials, such as St. Joseph County Board of Commissioners president Andy Kostielney, have come out in opposition to a downtown station due to its cost. The county has continued to officially prefer the west airport option. However, this could cost more than $50 million, and South Bend mayor James Mueller (Buttigieg's successor) has remained tepid towards contributing funding to a new station on the west side of the airport without first hearing a persuasive case that a freight complex there would have strong economic benefit. Mueller has also stated that he believes the cost projections of both the downtown and west airport options have increased to such  a point that neither is realistic without financial support from federal or state sources. In early 2022, Mueller stated that the city's long-term vision is to have a station located in its downtown. There has been speculation as to whether Buttigieg, now United States secretary of transportation, would be hesitant to make federal funding available to the project, out of fear of the appearance of favoritism to his hometown.

In 2021, NICTD officials indicated that if a new station is built on the west side of the airport, they intend to run short turn shuttle trains between Michigan City, Indiana and the station in order to encourage use of the airport. These trains would run in addition to the existing trains that travel to/from Chicago. It was suggested that the shuttle trains could run hourly.

NICTD advances plans for station on the west side of airport (2022–present)
On August 1, 2022, the NICTD Board of Trustees voted to issue a request for proposals to move the station to the west side of the airport. NICTD's president claimed that such a project would neither interfere with potential freight operations at the airport nor the possibility of adding a station in downtown South Bend. NICTD hopes to be able to obtain federal funds allotted by the Infrastructure Investment and Jobs Act.

In November 2022, NICTD hired an engineering firm to complete $6 million in design work for the proposed route to a west airport station, with preliminary environmental studies being scheduled to be finished in September 2023 and engineering studies scheduled to be finished in March 2024. The preliminary environmental studies would assist in the eligibility of the project for federal grants. As of the time that the engineering firm was hired, NICTD officials expressed openness to the possibility of building a branch line to downtown South Bend after a west airport station is possibly opened. Around this time, South Bend Mayor James Mueller commented that one advantage he recognized rerouting to the west side of the airport having over keeping the existing alignment was a decrease in the number of at-grade railway crossings, remarking, "fewer crossings at grade crossings leads to better safety for our motorists and pedestrians and bicyclists that have to traverse those intersections. So it's safety, it's economy, it's a win-win for our community." At this point plans for the west airport relocation have construction beginning as early as the fall or winter of 2024 dependent on the ability to secure federal funding.

References

External links
South Bend Station Alternatives Feasibility Study Findings
South Bend South Shore Line Downtown Station Feasibility Study
NICTD 20-year Business Plan (2014)

South Shore Line stations in Indiana
Transportation in South Bend, Indiana
Railway stations in St. Joseph County, Indiana
Pete Buttigieg
South bend